Forkner is a surname. Notable people with the surname include:

Adam Forkner (born 1976), American musician
Hamden L. Forkner (1897–1975), American educator and writer
Tom Forkner (1918–2017), American businessman, lawyer, and golfer

See also
Fortner